Ernst Müller can refer to:

 Ernst Müller (boxer) (born 1954), a German boxer
 Ernst Müller (footballer) (1901–1958), a German footballer